Goranov (masculine) or Goranova is a Bulgarian surname. Notable people with the surname include:

Aleksandar Goranov (born 1988), Bulgarian footballer
Ivan Goranov (born 1992), Bulgarian footballer
Kamen Goranov (born 1948), Bulgarian sport wrestler
Maria Goranova, American academic
Plamen Goranov (1976–2013), Bulgarian photographer and activist
Rumen Goranov (born 1984), Bulgarian footballer
Rumyancho Goranov (born 1950), Bulgarian footballer
Vladislav Goranov (born 1977), Bulgarian politician

Bulgarian-language surnames